Arthur Francisco Carmazzi (born August 21, 1962) is an Italian-American writer / speaker living in Asia and founder of the Directive Communication Methodology.

Biography
Carmazzi was born in Carson City, Nevada. He went to Carson High School and attended University of Nevada - Reno, Pacific University, and Montana State University but did not graduate. He was hired as a copywriter in his first job in Deco & Co. in 1986 and became the youngest account executive in the history of the company. He left Deco on 1988 to build a small company he purchased – Frontier Corporate Kit Company – that dealt in corporate business structure to a legal clientele.

In 1990, he was stabbed in an attempted robbery. Afterwards, he sold his company and traveled the globe for two years.

In 1992, he moved to South Korea as Managing Director to the Asian venture of the Grail Corporation, an American consulting company dealing in the creation of new retail distribution chains for B2B organisations.

In 1997, Carmazzi’s success prompted him to start his own retail chain in Singapore. Within a year and a half, Carmazzi found himself a half-million Singapore dollars in debt.

Carmazzi returned to the corporate world in 1999. Carmazzi formed his own company and in 2005 he began licensing his Directive Communication Methodology multi-level marketing process to other trainers and consultants around the globe.

He is also the owner of Avalon Villa Resort Ubud based in Bali, Indonesia.

Career as author
The 6 Dimensions of Top Achievers, co-written by David Rogers, was published in 2000.

Arthur Carmazzi professes his writing style to be greatly influenced by Ken Blanchard.

In the December 2002 “Identity Intelligence” was published, but was removed due to threat of a lawsuit. The book has sold about 12,200 copies at Carmazzi’s talks and on his own personal website as of 2006.

Carmazzi's Asia headquarters is based in Bali, Indonesia.

In 2011, Carmazzi was listed on the website GlobalGurus's world's top 30 most influential leadership professionals list.

Works
 2000 – The 6 Dimensions of Top Achievers (co-written with David Rogers) 
 2002 – Identity Intelligence – the force for making the right decisions for personal and professional success 
 2005 – Leadership Intelligence Seminar - Fining your best Leadership Identity 
 2007 – Lessons from the Monkey King, leading change to create Gorilla Sized Results 
 2007 – The Culture Evolution handbook
 2007 - The 6 Dimensions of Top Achievers
 2004 - 2007 The Directive Communication Facilitation Series (12 volumes)
2009 - The Colored Brain Communication Field Manual
 2012 - The Meta Secret (one of the teachers in the book)
 The psychology of selecting the right employee
2017 - Architects of Extraordinary Team Culture

References

External links
Caramazzi.net
Official website
Arthur Caramazzi Group

1962 births
Living people
People from Carson City, Nevada
American writers of Italian descent